Hussein Darbouk was a colonel in the Libyan Armed Forces under former Libyan leader Muammar Gaddafi until the 2011 Libyan civil war, when he defected to the National Transitional Council. Darbouk had been commanding rebel forces in the city of Zawiya.

On 4 March, Alaa al-Zawi, an activist in the city of Zawiya announced that the commander of the city's rebel forces — Hussein Darbouk — was shot to death by fire from an anti-aircraft gun as the Khamis Brigade bombarded the city's western edges with mortars, heavy machine guns, tanks and anti-aircraft guns fighting armed Zawiyan residents and defected military units.

References

2011 deaths
Libyan colonels
Year of birth missing
Libyan military personnel killed in action
People killed in the First Libyan Civil War